Only You is a 1992 comedy film starring Andrew McCarthy, Kelly Preston and Helen Hunt and was directed by Betty Thomas, in her film directing debut.

Plot 
Clifford Godfrey is a doll's house designer who is dumped by his fiancée a few hours before they are to depart for a vacation in Mexico. Clare Enfield, a travel agent, informs Cliff that his tickets are non-refundable. Upset, Cliff goes to a bar where he meets Amanda Hughes, a woman recently dumped by her rich boyfriend Max after he reunited with his estranged wife: she agrees to travel along with Cliff to Mexico.

When Amanda sobers the following morning, she has no recollection of sleeping with or traveling with Cliff to Mexico. Despite her initial reservations, he convinces Amanda to stay with him for the duration of the getaway. During their vacation, she continually flirts with and then rejects Cliff, manipulating him and having him take her on a shopping spree at the resort as well as an expensive dinner, where she pays little attention to Cliff and flirts with other men.

During dinner at the hotel, Cliff runs into Clare again, who is photographing the restaurant for a travel brochure of the resort, and thanks her for not allowing him a refund. After dinner, Amanda leads Cliff to a jacuzzi pool where she asks him to strip and wait for her in the water while she goes back to retrieve a missing earring. While he waits, Amanda flirts with various men at the bar. Amanda is a no-show once again after Cliff returns to the hotel room and draws a romantic bubble bath, falling asleep. He now begins to see Amanda for the shallow gold digger she is.

Eventually Cliff and Clare begin a romance, only to have it disturbed by Amanda throughout the vacation.

Cast 
 Andrew McCarthy as Clifford Godfrey
 Kelly Preston as Amanda Hughes
 Helen Hunt as Clare Enfield

References

External links 
 
 
 

1992 films
1992 romantic comedy films
American romantic comedy films
Films directed by Betty Thomas
1992 directorial debut films
1990s English-language films
1990s American films